Mundo Nuevo (1966–1971, Spanish for "the New World") was an influential Spanish-language periodical, being a monthly revista de cultura (literary magazine) dedicated to new Latin American literature. Sponsored by the Ford Foundation, the magazine was founded by Emir Rodríguez Monegal in Paris, France, in 1966 and distributed worldwide. Monegal edited it until 1968 and resigned after a five-part installation in the New York Times that revealed the Congress for Cultural Freedom, a source of funding for the magazine, was a front for the CIA. In fact, it was started as a successor of another Spanish language magazine of the Congress, namely Cuadernos. Mundo Nuevo stopped in 1971 after 58 issues.

Mundo Nuevo prepublished then-new writers, such as Mario Vargas Llosa or chapters of Gabriel García Márquez's One Hundred Years of Solitude, famous poets such as Octavio Paz and younger writers, such as Guillermo Cabrera Infante or Severo Sarduy. It contributed to the 1960s publishing phenomenon dubbed "The Boom" in Latin American literature.

History

Foundation
In 1966, the Ford Foundation decided to publish a Latin American literary magazine. They approached Emir Rodríguez Monegal, scholar of Latin American literature and friend of Borges and Neruda. The magazine was published via ILARI (Instituto Latinoamericano de Relaciones Internacionales) which was habilitated to receive the Ford funding.

Monegal's only demand was to establish it in Paris, France, because, as he explained later, "Paris [...] has the advantage of being a great city where you can still live cheaply. Latin American writers, especially during the sixties, always made their sentimental journey to Paris, and I knew that I could always find talent just outside the door. Besides, if you publish a magazine in any Latin American city, it inevitably takes on a local air. This was just what I wanted to avoid. And the French postal service enabled us to reach the entire New World."

Contribution (1966–1968)
In July 1966, the first issue was published. It was a 23 cm illustrated magazine. Mundo Nuevo published articles and interviews, prose, poetry, and essays, but also excerpts of unreleased texts. It helped launch the career of younger writers such as Guillermo Cabrera Infante, Severo Sarduy, Manuel Puig but also helped then-new writers such as Gabriel García Márquez, Carlos Fuentes, Mario Vargas Llosa, or José Donoso.

During 1966, Mundo Nuevo prepublished two chapters of García Márquez's breakthrough novel One Hundred Years of Solitude one year before the book's release; Monegal explained, "I wanted to prepare the ground for the book, which came out in 1967."

Mundo Nuevo contributed to the 1960s publishing phenomenon dubbed "The Boom" in Latin American literature that led to many Latin American writers being published outside of their home countries and gaining critical recognition.

Opposition
Monegal directed Mundo Nuevo with full editorial control. In those times of Cold War, the magazine was attacked and boycotted from the beginning by Cuba and Latin-American Castrists or Marxists. Monegal defined himself as "a socialist of the English Labour Party type" who "had nothing to do with what they call socialism in the Soviet Union" and he refused to turn Mundo Nuevo into yet another pro-Communist or anti-Communist journal. He explained later, "I conceived Mundo Nuevo as an open forum and invited writers of all political persuasions to contribute to it." This stand of independence also attracted the ire of the anti-Castro in exile.

In 1967, a political scandal was manufactured, with a rumor alleging that Mundo Nuevo was funded by the CIA. In answer, Monegal published in the July 1967 issue of Mundo Nuevo "La CIA y los intelectuales" ("The CIA and the intellectuals"), an article not only debunking the rumor, but also lambasting both the Stalinists and the CIA. He expressed (translated from the Spanish) "the strongest condemnation" of the CIA's actions against intellectuals "who had demonstrated independence against Fascism and Stalinism", being "victim of slander of the organized reaction of the McCarthyist or Stalinist gangs" and of "the deceit" of "the CIA or other corrupters from other sides". This article, and its follow-up two months later, did not amuse Monegal's backers. Escalating disagreements with the Ford Foundation and the ILARI eventually led to Monegal's resignation in July 1968.

Dissolution (1968–1971)

As Monegal explained, the magazine was moved to Argentina in Buenos Aires, "where it became just one more anti-Communist journal. It died of exhaustion in the early seventies."

In 1971, the last issue was the double #57/58 for the months of March/April.

References
 Primary sources consulted 

 
 

 Tertiary sources consulted 

 
 
 

 Endnotes

1966 establishments in France
1971 disestablishments in Argentina
CIA activities in France
Congress for Cultural Freedom
Defunct literary magazines
Defunct magazines published in Argentina
Literary magazines published in Argentina
Magazines established in 1966
Magazines disestablished in 1971
Magazines published in Paris
Magazines published in Buenos Aires
Monthly magazines published in Argentina
Propaganda newspapers and magazines
Spanish-language magazines